James Lowry Macauley (born 24 November 1889 – 8 October 1945), also known as Jim,  was a professional footballer, who played for Rangers, Huddersfield Town and Preston North End. He also played football for Ireland, scoring one goal. He played as an inside forward.

Career
His family moved to Belfast when he was young and he attended St. Enoch's Presbyterian School, before going to Belfast Royal Academy. McAuley played amateur football for Cliftonville, scoring in their Irish Cup final replay win over Bohemians in Dublin in 1909 and the Irish League victory in 1910, before signing for Rangers. During the Great war he returned to Ireland and guested for Belfast Celtic. In 1919 he returned to England, and played for Leicester City in the Second Division, the club had recently formed after the disbanding of the previous team in the city. At the end of his career he played for Grimsby Town and Lancaster Town and Morecambe.

Honours
Cliftonville
 Irish Cup 1909
 Irish League 1910
Preston North End
 Division Two Runners-up 1914-1915

References

Bibliography

1889 births
Irish association footballers (before 1923)
Pre-1950 IFA international footballers
Association footballers from County Laois
Association football midfielders
English Football League players
Scottish Football League players
Rangers F.C. players
Huddersfield Town A.F.C. players
Preston North End F.C. players
1945 deaths
People from Portarlington, County Laois
Association football inside forwards
Cloughfern F.C. players
Cliftonville F.C. players
Belfast Celtic F.C. players
Leicester City F.C. players
Grimsby Town F.C. players
Lancaster City F.C. players
Morecambe F.C. players